General elections were held in Luxembourg on 23 December 1915. The Party of the Right emerged as the largest party, winning 25 of the 52 seats in the Chamber of Deputies.

Background
Earlier in the year Grand Duchess Marie-Adélaïde had appointed a right-wing minority government. However, the government was unable to function properly due to its lack of a majority in the Chamber of Deputies. Marie-Adélaïde then dissolved the Chamber and called new elections.

Results

By canton

Aftermath
Although the Party of the Right increased their representation from 20 to 25 seats, they were still short of a majority. The Hubert Loutsch government lost a vote of confidence on 11 January 1916 and resigned. Marie-Adélaïde's interference in domestic politics was strongly criticised by left-wing parties, and was partially responsible for her being forced to abdicate in favour of Charlotte in 1919.

References

Luxembourg
1915 in Luxembourg
Chamber of Deputies (Luxembourg) elections
December 1915 events